Veronika Trnková (born ) is a Czech volleyball player, playing as a middle-blocker. She is part of the Czech Republic women's national volleyball team.

She competed at the 2015 FIVB Volleyball World Grand Prix, 2015 Women's European Volleyball Championship. and 2019 Women's European Volleyball League, winning a gold medal.

On club level she plays for VfB 91 Suhl e.V.

References

External links

Middle blockers
Czech women's volleyball players
1995 births
Living people
Place of birth missing (living people)